Lý (Hán-Nôm: 李, pronounced like ) is a Vietnamese surname. It is the 14th most common Vietnamese surname and is the 1176th most common American surname, according to the 2010 United States Census.

Origin
Traditionally, the surname Li is derived from the title Dali held by Gao Yao (Cao Dao in Vietnamese), a legendary minister of the Xia dynasty, and was originally written with a different character (理). There is a claim that Lao Tzu (Lão Tử in Vietnamese), the founder of Taoism, was named Ly Nhi (李耳). Ly Nhi is the first known historical figure with the surname and is considered the possible founding ancestor.

One of the earliest occurrences of the name Lý in Vietnam is the warrior Lý Ông Trọng, who lived around 200 BCE.

Lý Thái Tổ established the Lý dynasty (sometimes known as the Later Lý dynasty), which ruled the Vietnam from 1009 to 1225.

People surnamed Ly

Monarchs of the Lý dynasty
 Lý Bí
 Lý Phật Tử
 Lý Công Uẩn
 Lý Nhân Tông
 Lý Thái Tông
 Lý Thánh Tông
Lý Chiêu Hoàng (李佛金), empress regnant in the history of Vietnam, last sovereign of the Lý Dynasty

Others
 Lý Đạo Thành, a courtier under the Lý dynasty
Lý Long Tường (李龍祥), prince of Lý dynasty
 Lý Thường Kiệt, Lý dynasty general
Lý Tiến (李進), civil servant in Jiaozhi, later became Imperial adviser for Emperor Xian of Han in capital Luoyang
Lý Trường Nhân (李長仁), local ruler of Jiaozhou recognised by Emperor Ming of Song from 468 to 485.
Ly dynasty
Lý Nam Đế (李賁), founder of the Early Lý dynasty of Vietnam
Lý Thái Tổ (李公蘊), founder of the Lý dynasty of Vietnam and founder of Hanoi in 1010

See also
 Lee (Korean surname)
 Li (surname)

References

External links
 http://www.tin247.com/them_mot_chi_thuoc_dong_ho_ly_o_han_quoc_tim_ve_viet_nam-1-21407635.html
 http://tuoitre.vn/tin/chinh-tri-xa-hoi/phong-su-ky-su/20061113/di-tim-dong-ho-ly-o-han-quoc---ky-1-hoang-tu-ra-di/172256.html

Vietnamese-language surnames

vi:Lý (họ)